The Korek Mountain Resort & Spa is located on Mount Korek near the town of Bekhal, Rawandoz in the autonomous Region of Kurdistan in Northern Iraq. This resort has been built by Darin Group a North Iraq-based general trading and construction company.

The Resort is built on top of the Mount Korek at 1690 m accessible by a Teleferic (cable car) which is approximately 4 km long and starts from TS Base in Bekhal.

The Resort has many activities and has 132 villas (Not all open yet as work is still on). The Resort is managed by an international management team appointed by Darin Group.

References